The Erlun Story House is a historic building in Erlun Township, Yunlin County, Taiwan.

History
The story house building was originally constructed as the Erlun Police Station in 1899 during the Japanese rule of Taiwan as the first police station in Yunlin, then part of Tainan Prefecture. In 2005, the building was designated as a historical building by Yunlin County Government. It was then reopened as Erlun Story House in 2014 after NT$8.45 million renovation.

See also
 List of museums in Taiwan

References

2014 establishments in Taiwan
Art museums and galleries in Taiwan
Residential buildings completed in 1899
Former police stations in Taiwan
Museums established in 2014
Museums in Yunlin County